Alpine skiing at the 1976 Winter Paralympics consisted of 28 events, 15 for men and 13 for women.

Medal table

Medal summary 
The competition events were:

Giant slalom: men - women
Slalom: men - women
Alpine combination: men - women

Each event had separate standing classifications:

I - standing, single leg amputation above the knee
II - standing, single leg amputation below the knee
III - standing, single arm amputation
IV A - standing, double leg amputation below the knee, mild cerebral palsy, or equivalent impairment
IV B - standing, double arm amputation

Men's events

Women's events

See also
Alpine skiing at the 1976 Winter Olympics

References 

 

 

 Historical Medallists : Vancouver 2010 Winter Paralympics, Official website of the 2010 Winter Paralympics
 Winter Sport Classification, Canadian Paralympic Committee

1976 Winter Paralympics events
1976
Paralympics